Perissodactyla is an order of placental mammals composed of odd-toed ungulates—hooved animals which bear weight on one or three of their five toes with the other toes either present, absent, vestigial, or pointing backwards. Members of this order are called perissodactyls, and include rhinoceroses, tapirs, and horses. They are primarily found in Africa, southern and southeastern Asia, and Central America, and are found in a variety of biomes, most typically grassland, savanna, inland wetlands, shrubland, and desert. Perissodactyls range in size from the 1.8 m (6 ft) long Baird's tapir to the 4 m (13 ft) long white rhinoceros. Over 50 million domesticated donkeys and 58 million horses are used in farming worldwide, while four species of perissodactyl have potentially fewer than 200 members remaining. Three subspecies of the black rhinoceros, the Syrian wild ass subspecies of the onager, and the tarpan subspecies of the wild horse have gone extinct in the last 200 years.

The eighteen extant species of Perissodactyla are divided into two suborders: Ceratomorpha, containing the families Rhinocerotidae and Tapiridae, and Hippomorpha, containing the family Equidae. Rhinocerotidae contains five species of rhinoceroses split into four genera, Tapiridae contains four species of tapir in a single genus, and Equidae contains nine species in a single genus, including horses, donkeys, and zebras. Over 75 extinct Perissodactyla species have been discovered, though due to ongoing research and discoveries the exact number and categorization is not fixed.

Conventions

Conservation status codes listed follow the International Union for Conservation of Nature (IUCN) Red List of Threatened Species. Range maps are provided wherever possible; if a range map is not available, a description of the bovid's range is provided. Ranges are based on the IUCN Red List for that species unless otherwise noted. All extinct species or subspecies listed alongside extant species went extinct after 1500 CE, and are indicated by a dagger symbol "".

Classification
The order Perissodactyla consists of two suborders, Ceratomorpha and Hippomorpha. Ceratomorpha contains the five species in four genera of the Rhinocerotidae family as well as the five species in one genera of the Tapiridae family. Hippomorpha contains a single family, Equidae, in turn containing nine species in a single genus. Many of these species are further subdivided into subspecies. This does not include hybrid species such as the mule, hinny, or zebroid, or extinct prehistoric species. Several perissodactyla subspecies have gone extinct in modern times, namely the southern black rhinoceros, north-eastern black rhinoceros, and western black rhinoceros subspecies of the black rhinoceros, the Syrian wild ass subspecies of the onager, and the tarpan subspecies of the wild horse.

Suborder Ceratomorpha
 Family Rhinocerotidae (rhinoceros)
 Ceratotherium: 1 species
 Dicerorhinus: 1 species
 Diceros: 1 species
  Rhinoceros: 2 species
 Family Tapiridae (tapir)
 Tapirus: 4 species
Suborder Hippomorpha
 Family Equidae (horse, donkey, zebra)
 Equus: 9 species

Perissodactyls
The following classification is based on the taxonomy described by Mammal Species of the World (2005), with augmentation by generally accepted proposals made since using molecular phylogenetic analysis.

Suborder Ceratomorpha

Rhinocerotidae

Tapiridae

Suborder Hippomorpha

Equidae

References

Sources

 
 
 

 
perissodactyls
perissodactyls